VVV-Venlo (VVV stands for Venlose Voetbal Vereniging  meaning "Venlo Football Club") is a Dutch football club from Venlo, a city on the border with Germany. They play in the Eerste Divisie, the second tier of Dutch football, following relegation from the Eredivisie in the 2020–21 season. The club plays its home games in the Covebo Stadion – De Koel stadium, which is named after one of the club's sponsors Covebo Uitzendgroep. VVV's home colors are yellow and black.

History

Foundation and first decades (1903–1952)
VVV originated from the association football club De Gouden Leeuw, which was founded by a group of friends in Venlo at the end of the nineteenth century. A few more name changes would occur, and the team was also known as Valuas for some time. Eventually, it was decided on 7 February 1903 to change the name to Venlose Voetbal Vereniging (VVV), the current name of the club. VVV wrote itself into the history books as one of the oldest clubs in Dutch professional football. In 1909, the clubs VITOS and THOR merged and became part of VVV. Quick followed in 1910.

During the first years of its existence, VVV could not enter the highest league of Dutch football. This was due to the fact that before the 1911–12 season, there was no first-tier Eerste Klasse in the southern Netherlands, but only Eastern and a Western Eerste Klasse. From the 1912–13 season, the South also competed in its own Eerste Klasse. VVV has been part of this since its introduction into Dutch football, with varying degrees of success. After the 1921–22 season, the club suffered relegation to the second-tier Tweede Klasse. Afterwards, the team played for some time in the Tweede Klasse, in which they won the championship during several seasons. They, however, failed to reach promotion to the Eerste Klasse again afterwards. After the end of World War II, the number of Eerste Klasse teams was expanded, which also included VVV. From 1948 to 1952, the club achieved fourth-place finishes in the Eerste Klasse.

Recent years (2006–present)
VVV returned to the Eredivisie, the highest league in the Netherlands, by defeating RKC Waalwijk (3–0) in the promotion/relegation play-offs in the 2006–07 season. After one season in the Eredivisie, VVV-Venlo were relegated back to the Eerste Divisie. After a single season, VVV-Venlo won the 2008–09 Eerste Divisie title and returned to the Eredivisie.

In the 2009–10 season, the team booked its best league result since 1988 after finishing 12th in the Eredivisie. Another remarkable event was the transfer of star player Keisuke Honda to CSKA Moscow. They also signed toddler Baerke van der Meij on a symbolic ten-year contract, after a video featuring him scoring a hat trick into a toy box became popular. Honda was replaced by Gonzalo and the club signed Japanese player Maya Yoshida. The departure of Honda turned out to be a key point in the club's season. In the second half of the season, the team was not able to win matches and barely escaped from relegation.

At the end of the season, key players Ruben Schaken and Adil Auassar both signed with Feyenoord on a free transfer. Gonzalo returned to his employer Groningen, while Sandro Calabro signed with Swiss side St. Gallen. The club contracted Ruud Boymans and the Nigerian Ahmed Musa to strengthen the squad for the 2010–11 season. They avoided relegation, but it was a harsh season in which Jan van Dijk was fired and former international Patrick Paauwe terminated his contract after losing the competition from his competitors.

Belgian manager Glen De Boeck was signed for the next season, but failed to improve the results. As a result of that, he resigned in December 2011. Ton Lokhoff was recruited as the new manager and succeeded in avoiding relegation by winning the post-season play-offs. However, in the 2012–13 season, the club was relegated after losing the promotion/relegation play-offs against Go Ahead Eagles. The club finished fifth in its first Eerste Divisie season since its promotion in 2009. But again, the club bounced back and returned to the Eredivisie in 2017, after clinching promotion by defeating RKC Waalwijk.

On 24 October 2020, VVV-Venlo suffered the biggest defeat in Eredivisie history by losing to Ajax at home 13–0.

Japanese players
Since Keisuke Honda transferred from Nagoya Grampus in 2008, a slew of Japanese players have played at VVV-Venlo, including Maya Yoshida, Robert Cullen and Yuki Otsu. Sef Vergoossen, a legendary manager of the club, and Japanese agent Tetsuro Kiyooka were a bridge between the Japanese players and the club.

Community support

The official club mascot since 1 July 2004 is a dog named "Koelie".

The Jan Klaassens Museum, set up in 2003 is located in the city center of Venlo and is operated by the Limburgs Museum. Since 2005, VVV has annually presented the Jan Klaassens Award to the greatest talent from its own youth academy.

The Herman Teeuwen Memorial, named after the club icon who died suddenly in 2003, since 2004 has been organised by the club, usually with well-known foreign clubs participating on an invitational basis.

VVV announced in July 2015 that they would be retiring the number 28 shirt in memory of youth player Beau Vilters, who had previously worn that number but was killed in a traffic accident on 14 June 2015, at the age of 18.

In April 2011, after a viral video of a local toddler, Baerke van der Meij, grandson of VVV player Jan van der Meij, showing him scoring a hat trick into his toy box, the club gave the 18-month-old an honorary contract.

Stadium
VVV-Venlo currently play at De Koel in Venlo. The stadium holds 8,000 people and was built in 1972. It is named after its main sponsor, hence its current name, Covebo Stadion De Koel.

Results

Players

Current squad

Retired numbers
28 —  Beau Vilters , defender (2014–15) — posthumous honour

Notable players

  Remco Torken
  Keisuke Honda
  Giorgos Giakoumakis

Domestic results
Below is a table with VVV-Venlo's domestic results since the introduction of the Eredivisie in 1956.

Club staff

Coaching history

References

External links

Fanclub – Fanclub D'n Twellefde Man 
Fanclub – GoodOld VVV 
Fanclub – East Side Venlo (ESV) 

 
Football clubs in the Netherlands
Association football clubs established in 1903
1903 establishments in the Netherlands
Football clubs in Limburg (Netherlands)
Sport in Venlo